DCPL may refer to:
DeKalb County Public Library
District of Columbia Public Library
Dodge City Public Library